Russell Morgan Davis (born March 28, 1975) is a former American football defensive tackle.  He played college football at the University of North Carolina at Chapel Hill. The Chicago Bears selected Davis in the second round and 49th overall in the 1999 NFL Draft, and Davis played the 1999 season for the Bears. Davis then played for the Arizona Cardinals from 2000 to 2005, the Seattle Seahawks in 2006, and the New York Giants in 2007 and won the Super Bowl XLII title with the Giants that year.

Early life and college
Davis graduated in 1994 from E. E. Smith High School in his birthplace of Fayetteville, North Carolina, and Davis was an All-State selection as a two-way lineman. He then attended the University of North Carolina at Chapel Hill, and played on the North Carolina Tar Heels football team from 1995 to 1998 after redshirting the 1994 season. In 22 games started for North Carolina, Davis had 10.5 sacks and was in the same defensive line as 1998 NFL Draft picks Greg Ellis and Vonnie Holliday.

In his freshman season (1995), Davis had 46 tackles and three sacks in eight starts. In 1996 as a sophomore, Davis had  27 tackles and 2.5 sacks. In 1997 as a junior, Davis had 60 tackles and three sacks in 10 games (with 9 starts). Ellis played only two games as a senior in 1998 due to an ankle injury but had 36 tackles and two sacks for the year.

Professional career

Chicago Bears (1999)
In the 1999 NFL Draft, the Chicago Bears selected Davis in the second round, 49th overall. As a rookie in 1999, Davis played in 11 games with 8 starts and made 13 tackles and 2 sacks. Davis made his first NFL career sack on September 12, 1999 to Kansas City Chiefs quarterback Elvis Grbac.

Arizona Cardinals (2000–2005)
The Arizona Cardinals acquired Davis off waivers after the Bears cut Davis. Davis made 30 tackles and a forced fumble in 2000 with Arizona in 14 games with 9 starts. Davis' first full season of 16 starts in 16 games was in 2001; he had a career-best 54 tackles on the season, 2 sacks, and deflected a pass. Again in 2002 Davis played and started all 16 games in the regular season. He made 44 tackles, 2 sacks, and 2 passes defended. In 2003, playing and starting 15 games, Davis made 37 tackles, 1 sack, 2 passes defended, and a forced fumble. In 2004, Davis made 49 tackles, 1 sack, 3 passes defended, and 1 forced fumble in 16 games (all starts). After starting the first three games of 2005, Davis spent the rest of the year on injured reserve due to a left biceps injury. Davis made 5 tackles in 2005.

Seattle Seahawks (2006)
In 13 games (no starts), Davis made 30 tackles and 3 sacks with the Seattle Seahawks in 2006.

New York Giants (2007)
In his final NFL season, Davis played 11 games with the New York Giants in 2007. He had 5 tackles and 2 passes deflected. He played two playoff games, and the Giants later won Super Bowl XLII.

References

External links

1975 births
Living people
North Carolina Tar Heels football players
African-American players of American football
American football defensive tackles
Chicago Bears players
Arizona Cardinals players
Seattle Seahawks players
New York Giants players
People from Cumberland County, North Carolina
Sportspeople from Fayetteville, North Carolina
Players of American football from North Carolina
21st-century African-American sportspeople
20th-century African-American sportspeople